Trigoniophthalmus alternatus is a species of jumping bristletail in the family Machilidae. It is found in Europe and Northern Asia (excluding China) and North America.

References

Further reading

External links

 

Archaeognatha
Articles created by Qbugbot
Insects described in 1904